Pancasila is the official, foundational philosophical theory of Indonesia. The name is made from two words originally derived from Sanskrit: "pañca" ("five") and "śīla" ("principles", "precepts").

It is composed of five principles:
Ketuhanan yang Maha Esa (Belief in the one and only God)
Kemanusiaan yang adil dan beradab (Just and civilized humanity)
Persatuan Indonesia (The unity of Indonesia)
Kerakyatan yang dipimpin oleh hikmat kebijaksanaan dalam permusyawaratan/perwakilan (Democracy guided by the inner wisdom in the unanimity arising out of deliberations among representatives)
Keadilan sosial bagi seluruh rakyat Indonesia (Social justice for the whole of the people of Indonesia)

The legal formulation of Pancasila is contained in the fourth paragraph of the preamble of the Constitution of Indonesia.

Background
In 1942, the Empire of Japan invaded and occupied the Dutch East Indies. Following setbacks in the Pacific War, the Japanese promised future self-government for Indonesia and in September 1943, established the Central Advisory Council (CAC) in Java, chaired by pre-war independence activist Sukarno. On 15 November 1944, at the fourth session of the CAC, Sukarno gave a speech listing five guidelines for life for the Indonesian nation. These had been produced by a committee headed by Sukarno, and were dubbed the "Five Obligations" (Panca Dharma). They were:
we together with other nations in Greater East Asia are lifelong allies of Japan;
we will establish a nation of Free Indonesia, with full respect for the service/assistance from Japan and will remain a member of the Co-Prosperity Sphere;
we will endeavor to advance high morality and our culture;
we will give eternal service to the nation and people with all our strength and with devotion to Allah;
based on the Japanese principle (Hakkō ichiu), we will strive to build eternal peace.
On 1 March 1945, the Japanese 16th Army, which was responsible for Java during the Japanese occupation of the Dutch East Indies, announced the establishment of the Investigating Committee for Preparatory Work for Independence (BPUPK) to work on "preparations for independence in the region of the government of this island of Java." The first session of the BPUPK opened on 28 May 1945, and the following day began discussions on a basis for the future independent Indonesia. A number of speakers put forward proposals, and Wiranatakusumah suggested the Panca Dharma.

Formulation

On the final day of the first session, Indonesian nationalist Sukarno made a speech, later to become known as the "Birth of Pancasila Address", in which he outlined five principles, which he proposed would form the philosophical basis of an independent Indonesia. His original formulation was:

 Kebangsaan Indonesia: Indonesian patriotism; inclusion of all people living in Indonesia
 Internasionalisme: Internationalism emphasizing justice and the virtue of humanity,
 Musyawarah Mufakat: Deliberative consensus emphasizing a form of representative democracy in which ethnic dominance is absent and each member of the council possesses equal voting power,
 Kesejahteraan Sosial: Social Welfare premised on the theory of the welfare state and emphasizing popular socialism, and
 Ketuhanan yang Berkebudayaan: A Divinity that upholds religious freedom (A formulation that can be seen as allowing both monotheism or polytheism, thereby allowing space for all of Indonesia's major religions).

In his speech, Sukarno rejected the Panca Dharma as a name, saying that "dharma" meant 'obligation', but that he was proposing principles. He further said that he liked the symbolic meaning of "five" as there were Five Pillars of Islam, five fingers to a hand and five senses. He named the principles Pancasila.

During the recess between the two BPUPK sessions, the Committee of Nine (Panitia Sembilan), composed of Sukarno, Mohammad Hatta, Mohammad Yamin, Alexander Andries Maramis, Ahmad Subardjo, Ki Hadikusumo, Wachid Hasyim, Agus Salim, and Abikusno, formulated a preamble to a constitution including Sukarno's philosophy. This became known as the Jakarta Charter. The order of Sukarno's principles was changed, thus: the fifth sila of theism and freedom of religion became first sila; the second  sila remained, the original first sila was re-numbered as the third sila, and the original third and fourth sila were re-numbered as the fourth and fifth sila. Sukarno accepted this proposition of the other members. Further, the first sila of the Jakarta Charter and the Preamble of the Constitution of Indonesia of 1945, being the first of the original sila of Sukarno, was amended to read "Ketuhanan dengan kewajiban menjalankan syariah Islam bagi pemeluk-pemeluknya" ("The one divinity with the obligation for its Muslim adherents to carry out the Islamic law/Syari'ah"). On 18 August 1945 the PPKI amended it further by deleting "with the obligation for its Muslim adherents to carry out the Islamic law/Syari'ah" and therefore left the first sila as simply "Ketuhanan Yang Maha Esa".

Rationale
By the first half of the 20th century, some ideologies that had been established or made their way to the Dutch East Indies included imperialism and its antithesis anti-colonial nationalism, traditional Javanese statecraft, Islamism, democracy, socialism, and communism. Proponents of these ideologies had formed political organizations or parties to forward their respective causes. The Islamist party Sarekat Islam was established in 1905 followed by Masyumi in 1943. The Communist Party was established in 1914, while Sukarno's nationalist Indonesian National Party was established in 1927. Favoring one ideology over another would not satisfy the whole spectrum of Indonesian people, thus it was decided that the new republic needed to synthesize a new ideology derived from indigenous Indonesian values as well as common shared values derived from various ideologies.

On 30 September 1960, in a speech to the United Nations General Assembly XV, Sukarno affirmed that the first sila of Pancasila does not aim to persecute those who do not have a religion or are atheists. He said that because even those who do not believe in god have the characteristic  Indonesian tolerance, they accept "belief on the one and only God" in the first sila as a characteristic of the nation,

Pancasila was influenced by certain aspects of selected world values and ideologies, such as nationalism, humanitarianism, individual rights, freedom of religion, democracy, socialism. The need to unify this diverse country also led to the formulation of the national motto, Bhinneka Tunggal Ika, which can be translated as unity in diversity. It declares the essential unity of its members despite ethnic, regional, social, or religious differences.

A commander of the 1st Military Regional Command/Bukit Barisan in 1966 described Pancasila as a form of religious socialism.

Post-independence development

Sukarno 
In the campaign for the 1955 legislative election, nationalist parties such as the Indonesian National Party (PNI) and the Communist Party of Indonesia (PKI) used Pancasila in an anti-Islam sense, to distinguish themselves from the Islamic Masyumi Party as they feared that if Masyumi won the election, Islam would replace Pancasila as the basis of the nation. In the Constitutional Assembly, elected in 1955 to produce a permanent constitution to replace the 1950 Provisional Constitution, the parties organized themselves into factions depending on their preference for the national philosophy. The Pancasila Block had 53.3% of the seats, while the Islamic Block had 44.8%. The debate over which should prevail was not resolved through debate as on 5 July 1959, President Sukarno dissolved the assembly by decree and reimposed the 1945 Constitution. As this included the Pancasila formulation, the Pancasila/Islam debate was ended.

Suharto 

The New Order administration of Suharto, the second President of Indonesia, strongly supported Pancasila. His government promoted the five principles as a key national ideology.  They were outlined as representing the ancient wisdom of the Indonesian people, pre-dating the introduction of foreign religions such as Hinduism and Islam. In a July 1982 speech which reflected his attachment to Javanese beliefs, Suharto glorified Pancasila as a key to reach the perfect life of harmony with God and fellow men.

In 1978, Suharto secured a parliamentary resolution (Tap MPR No. 2/1978) on the Pancasila Appreciation and Practicing Guide (Pedoman Penghayatan dan Pengamalan Pancasila or P4) and later began a mandatory program to indoctrinate all Indonesians—from primary school students to office workers—for the application of the P4 and in living the national values. After initially being careful not to offend the sensitivities of Muslim scholars who feared that the Pancasila might develop into a quasi-religious cult, he secured another parliamentary resolution in 1983 (Tap MPR No. 11/1983) that officially made obedience to Pancasila mandatory to all organizations in Indonesia, public or private. In practice, the administration of Suharto exploited the vagueness of the Pancasila to justify its acts and to condemn opponents as "anti-Pancasila".

Criticism

The International Humanist and Ethical Union (IHEU), an atheist group, has criticized the first sila because it does not include a right to atheism, i.e. a rejection of theistic belief. The IHEU argued that this enables a culture of repression against atheists and that, as long as Indonesian law only recognizes the religions of Buddhism, Confucianism, Hinduism, and Islam, as well as both Catholic and Protestant Christianity, people who did not identify with any of them, including atheists, would "continue to experience official discrimination."

Criticism of the Pancasila is forbidden by the criminal code because the national emblem of Indonesia includes the Pancasila. According to article 68, its defamation carries a sentence of up to five years imprisonment or half a billion rupiah. In 2018, the controversial Islamic Defenders Front leader Muhammad Rizieq Shihab was charged under 154a and 320 of the Criminal Code on insulting the state ideology and defamation. The charges were later dropped.

The points of practice of Pancasila 
	
The points of practice of Pancasila (Butir-butir pengamalan Pancasila) is outlined in the People's Consultative Assembly Decree No. 1/MPR/2003.

See also

 Armorial of Indonesia
 Constitution of Indonesia
 Pancasila economics
 National emblem of Indonesia

Notes

References

Cited Works

 
 
 

 
 

 
 
 
 

 

 
Government of Indonesia
Indonesian culture
Indonesian nationalism
Discrimination against atheists
State ideologies